Ben Smith is a marathon runner who completed 401 marathons in 401 days in England between 2015 and 2016. He began his run on September 1, 2015 and ran for 284 consecutive marathons until a back injury forced him to stop for 10 days. He later resumed and finished with 401 marathons with a total of raised £330,000 for Kidscape and Stonewall. In 2016, he received the Helen Rollason Award at the BBC Sports Personality of the Year Awards. 

Smith wrote the book 401:The Extraordinary Story of the Man Who Ran 401 Marathons in 401 Days and Changed His Life Forever about his struggles with mental health, bullying, and divorce.

He started a foundation called the 401 Foundation to provide grants to organizations and individuals to focus on self-esteem and mental health. 

He announced in early 2021 that he will run and cycle 14,000 miles across 50 US states in 104 days in 2021, assuming COVID-19 restrictions allow.

Awards and honors 
 2016: ITV Fundraiser of the Year at the Pride of Britain Awards

 2016: Helen Rollason Award at the BBC Sports Personality of the Year Awards

 2016: the Power of Light Award from the Cabinet Office and former PM Theresa May

 2016: TedxYouth Talk on December 3, 2016

References 

Marathon runners

Year of birth missing (living people)
Living people